Du soleil au cœur (meaning Sunshine in the Heart) is the first French-language compilation album by Canadian singer Celine Dion, released in France on 20 September 1983. It is also Dion's first album released in France. It includes mainly songs from her two albums released in Quebec, Canada, Tellement j'ai d'amour... (1982) and Les chemins de ma maison (1983).

Content
The album is a compilation of songs from Dion's two Canadian albums: Tellement j'ai d'amour... and Les chemins de ma maison. It was released thanks to "D'amour ou d'amitié" success in France (number five on the Singles Chart). "Mon ami m'a quittée" was the follow-up single.

Du soleil au cœur included an extended version of "Ne me plaignez pas" and one new song, called "À quatre pas d'ici" (French adaptation of Bucks Fizz's UK number-one hit "The Land of Make Believe"). The latter was originally written by Andy Hill and Peter Sinfield. Both of them worked with Dion again in 1993 ("Think Twice") and 1996 ("Call the Man"). The Canadian fans could find "À quatre pas d'ici" on Dion's Christmas album Chants et contes de Noël, released in November 1983.

On 4 April 2002, after nineteen years Du soleil au cœur was re-released in France on a CD, including five bonus tracks. On 16 May 2008 it was also released in Switzerland.

Track listing

Personnel 
Adapted from AllMusic.
 Aaron Bernard – composer
 Céline Dion – primary artist
 Stephan Dumont – composer
 Claude Gaudette – composer
 Thierry Geoffroy – composer
 Hubert Giraud – composer
 Andy Hill – composer
 J.P. Lang – composer
 Patrick Lemaitre – composer
 Christian Loigerot – composer
 Eddy Marnay – composer
 Pierre Papadiamandis – composer
 Peter Sinfield – composer
 Steve Thompson – composer
 R. Walt Vincent – composer

Release history

References

External links
 

1983 compilation albums
Albums produced by Eddy Marnay
Celine Dion compilation albums
Albums produced by René Angélil